A geodesic circle is either "the locus on a surface at a constant geodesic distance from a fixed point" or a curve of constant geodesic curvature. 
A geodesic disk is the region on a surface bounded by a geodesic circle.
In contrast with the ordinary circle and disk, the geodesic circle is not necessarily a plane curve and the geodesic disk is not necessarily a planar surface.
They can be used to define Gaussian curvature.

References

Geodesic (mathematics)
Circles